Therese Grob (16 November 1798 – 17 March 1875) was a singer and is alleged to have been the first love of the composer Franz Schubert. 

The composer's friend Anselm Hüttenbrenner recalled – twenty-six years after Schubert's death: 

"From the time I met Schubert, he did not have the least affair of the heart. He was a dry patron towards the fair sex, therefore nothing less than gallant. (...) However, according to his statement, before he met me he had his eye on a teacher's daughter from the countryside, who was also said to be fond of him. She won his heart by singing a soprano solo from a mass by Schubert so well. What her father's name was and where he lived has slipped my mind. - The girl could not marry Schubert because he was too young at the time, without money or employment. She is said to have yielded to her father's will against her inclination and married another man who could provide for her. He had a prevailing antipathy to the daughters of Eve from that time, when he saw his sweetheart lost forever."

Therese Grob was the daughter of Heinrich Grob and Theresia Männer (died 22 August 1826). She was born in Lichtental, Vienna, Archduchy of Austria.  There was one other child, a boy called Heinrich (1800–1855) who was two years younger than Therese.  The father died on 6 April 1804.  The widowed mother continued to run the small silk-weaving business that Heinrich Senior had established.  The premises were very near to Schubert's home.  Therese had an attractive soprano voice, and the young Heinrich was a talented pianist and violinist.  The two families grew close through music-making.

Therese sang in the Lichtental parish church, which Schubert had been attending since he was a child.  For the church's centenary celebrations, the young Schubert completed his first mass in late July 1814 – the Mass in F, D.105 – and Therese sang the soprano solo at the premiere performance, which Schubert conducted himself. Schubert assembled an album of songs for Therese's brother Heinrich, the last of which is dated 1816.

Not a single love letter from Schubert to her has been passed down. What is thought to be known about his relations with her are mere conjectures. And even though friends report secret love stories many years after his death, contact with his childhood friend Therese Grob is likely to have been purely friendly.

A Marriage Consent Law enforced by Metternich expressly forbade marriages by men in Schubert's class if they could not verify their ability to support a family. Schubert's application in April 1816, eventually rejected, for the post of music teacher at a teachers' training college in Laibach (now Ljubljana, Slovenia) may have been in part driven by his awareness to gain some financial security to make marriage to Therese possible.

On 21 November 1820 Therese married Johann Bergmann (24 June 1797 – 1840), a baker. Together they had four children: Theresia (1821–1894), Johann Baptist (1822–1875), Amalia (9 July 1824 – 24 December 1886) and Carolina (b. 1828). Schubert himself never married. Eight years after the composer's death, on 14 September 1836, Schubert's brother Ignaz married Therese's aunt Wilhelmine.

Notes

References 
 Rita Steblin, "Therese Grob – New Documentary Research", Schubert durch die Brille 28, (Tutzing: Schneider 2002), 55–100.
 Brown, 'The Therese Grob Collection of Songs by Schubert', Music and Letters 1968; XLIX: 122–134

1798 births
1875 deaths
People from Alsergrund
Franz Schubert
Musicians from Vienna
Austrian sopranos
19th-century women musicians